Port Elizabeth Provincial Hospital is a large Provincial government funded hospital situated in central Port Elizabeth in South Africa. It is a tertiary teaching hospital and forms part of the Port Elizabeth Hospital Complex.

The hospital departments include Emergency department, Paediatric ward, Maternity ward, Obstetrics/Gynecology, Out Patients Department, Surgical Services, Medical Services, Operating Theatre & CSSD Services, Pharmacy, Anti-Retroviral (ARV) treatment for HIV/AIDS, Post Trauma Counseling Services, Ophthalmology Out-patients Clinic, Occupational Services, X-ray Services, Physiotherapy, NHLS Laboratory, Oral Health Care Provides, Laundry Services, Kitchen Services and Mortuary.

References
Eastern Cape Provincial Hospitals

Hospitals in the Eastern Cape
Buildings and structures in Port Elizabeth